The 2021 United States Men's Curling Championship was held from May 25 to 30, 2021 at the Wausau Curling Club in Wausau, Wisconsin. The event was held in conjunction with the 2021 United States Women's Curling Championship.

Impact of the COVID-19 pandemic
The event was originally scheduled to be held February 6 to 13 at the ImOn Ice Arena in Cedar Rapids, Iowa. In August 2020, a derecho damaged the arena and the COVID-19 pandemic caused the repairs to be delayed significantly enough to necessitate moving the championships to a different venue. In December 2020 the United States Curling Association (USCA) announced that, due to the continuing pandemic, the Men's, Women's, and Mixed Doubles National Championships would be postponed until May 2021 and would be conducted in a bio-secure bubble. Typically, the winner of the National Men's Championship would represent the United States at the World Championship, but this postponement moved the national championship after the 2021 World Men's Championship and so the USCA offered the spot at World's to the 2020 champion, Team Shuster. The site of the bubble for the championships was later announced to be Wausau Curling Club in Wausau, Wisconsin.

Qualification
Due to the pandemic, no qualification events were held and the qualification methods were modified. The top ten men's teams, determined by the World Curling Federation's World Team Ranking System, were invited to compete. Typically, the qualification methods would be the top five teams from the World Team Ranking System, the top four teams from a qualification event, and one team from the Junior Championship.

Teams
The ten teams competing in the championship are:

Round-robin standings
Final round-robin standings

Round-robin results
All draw times are listed in Central Daylight Time (UTC−05:00).

Draw 1
Tuesday, May 25, 1:00 pm

Draw 2
Tuesday, May 25, 8:00 pm

Draw 3
Wednesday, May 26, 12:00 pm

Draw 4
Wednesday, May 26, 8:00 pm

Draw 5
Thursday, May 27, 12:00 pm

Draw 6
Thursday, May 27, 8:00 pm

Draw 7
Friday, May 28, 12:00 pm

Draw 8
Friday, May 28, 8:00 pm

Draw 9
Saturday, May 29, 12:00 pm

Playoffs

1 vs. 2
Saturday, May 29, 6:00 pm

3 vs. 4
Saturday, May 29, 6:00 pm

Semifinal
Sunday, May 30, 9:00 am

Final
Sunday, May 30, 7:00 pm

References

United States National Curling Championships
Curling in Wisconsin
Sports in Wausau, Wisconsin
United States Men's
Curling
Curling